Villedaigne is a commune in the Aude department in southern France.

Population

Geography
The village lies on the left bank of the Orbieu, which forms all of the commune's eastern border.

History
William of Gellone was defeated in a battle with the Cordoban Muslim army led by Abd al-Malik ibn Abd al-Wahid ibn Mughith on his approach to Carcassonne. The expedition did not advance deeper into Carolingian territory.

See also
Communes of the Aude department

References

Communes of Aude